is a Japanese female singer-songwriter.

Background 
Sumioka was born in Noboribetsu city in the Hokkaido prefecture.

Just before graduating from high school, her juniors invited her to join a band as their vocalist. Since then she started composing songs with her father's acoustic guitar and writing lyrics herself.

During her university years, she was very active in her school's music club. She even became the head of the music club in her third year. She graduated from the Faculty of Environmental System Sciences of Rakuno Gakuen University in March 2012.

Career 
When Sumioka was playing her first live performance at a live house in 2009, she was scouted by some staff from Sony Music.

She debuted with the single "feel you" on June 20, 2012 under the Ki/oon music label.

She joined Fuji Television's reality show Terrace House: Boys × Girls Next Door as a regular cast member from July 12, 2013 to January 27, 2014, which greatly increased her popularity.

Discography

Singles 
 Nagareboshi (2009) - pre-debut, indies era
 feel you (June 20, 2012)
 Harenohi (January 30, 2013)
 Hello Yellow! / Nagareboshi (October 23, 2013)
 Kotoba ni Shitainda (February 26, 2014)
 flavor (May 28, 2014)
 My Friend / Bokura no Ayumu Michi (September 17, 2014)
 Large & Small GIFT (February 11, 2015)

Albums 
 Tsumugi Uta (November 27, 2013)
 watchword (November 12, 2014)
 Moment (April 27, 2016) - Mini Album
 Kokoro ga Kimi wo Utatteru (December 7, 2016)
 colors (August 23, 2017) - Double Mini Album

Filmography

Film

References

External links 

  
 Sony Music Artist Page 

1990 births
Living people
Musicians from Hokkaido
Anime musicians
Japanese women pop singers
Japanese women singer-songwriters
Japanese pop musicians
Ki/oon Music artists
21st-century Japanese women singers